The elimination rate constant K or Ke is a value used in pharmacokinetics to describe the rate at which a drug is removed from the human system.

It is often abbreviated K or Ke. It is equivalent to the fraction of a substance that is removed per unit time measured at any particular instant and has units of T−1. This can be expressed mathematically with the differential equation
, 

The solution of this differential equation is useful in calculating the concentration after the administration of a single dose of drug via IV bolus injection:

Ct is concentration after time t
C0 is the initial concentration (t=0)
K is the elimination rate constant

Derivation 
In first-order (linear) kinetics, the plasma concentration of a drug at a given time t  after single dose administration via IV bolus injection is given by;

where:
 C0 is the initial concentration (at t=0)
 t1/2 is the half-life time of the drug, which is the time needed for the plasma drug concentration to drop to its half

Therefore, the amount of drug present in the body at time t  is;

where Vd is the apparent volume of distribution

Then, the amount eliminated from the body after time t  is;

Then, the rate of elimination at time t is given by the derivative of this function with respect to t;

And since  is fraction of the drug that is removed per unit time measured at any particular instant, then if we divide the rate of elimination by the amount of drug in the body at time t, we get;

References

Pharmacokinetic metrics